Kneria is a genus of small fish in the family Kneriidae.  All 13 species in this genus are restricted to Africa.

Named in honor of Austrian ichthyologist Rudolf Kner (1810-1869)

Species
FishBase lists 13 species:

 Kneria angolensis Steindachner, 1866
 Kneria ansorgii (Boulenger, 1910)
 Kneria auriculata (Pellegrin, 1905) (Airbreathing shellear)
 Kneria katangae Poll, 1976
 Kneria maydelli Ladiges & Voelker, 1961 (Cunene kneria)
 Kneria paucisquamata Poll & D. J. Stewart, 1975
 Kneria polli Trewavas, 1936 (Western shellear)
 Kneria ruaha Seegers, 1995
 Kneria rukwaensis Seegers, 1995
 Kneria sjolandersi Poll, 1967
 Kneria stappersii Boulenger, 1915
 Kneria uluguru Seegers, 1995
 Kneria wittei Poll, 1944

However there is another species, known as the Southern Kneria (Kneria sp. 'South Africa'), occurring only in the headwaters of a few tributaries of the Crocodile River, in the Inkomati River system of South Africa. It was initially declared a Critically Endangered species on the IUCN Red List in 2007, but it was reassessed in 30 November 2016 as Endangered.

References

 
Kneriidae
Fish of Africa
Freshwater fish genera
Taxa named by Franz Steindachner
Taxonomy articles created by Polbot